"The Raider" was an American television play broadcast on February 19, 1959 as part of the CBS television series, Playhouse 90.  The cast included Frank Lovejoy, Donald Crisp, and Rod Taylor. Franklin Schaffner was the director and Loring Mandel the writer.

Plot
The Harman Corp. is the subject of a takeover attempt by a corporate raider.

Cast
The cast included the following:

 Frank Lovejoy - Arthur Hennicut
 Donald Crisp - Samuel Harman
 Leif Erickson - James Mayberry
 Rod Taylor - Robert Castillo
 Leon Ames - Leland Wolff
 Louis Jean Heydt - Marvin Tannis
 Carl Benton Reid - Mr. Church
 Paul Douglas - David Ringler
 George Mitchell - Corey Palmer
 Jennifer Howard - Rona Ringler
 Raymond Bailey - Mr. Stern
 Douglas Evans - Mr. Lassiter
 John Conwell - Mr. Leech
 Jean Inness - Mrs. Hurst
 Louise Vincent - Receptionist
 Ella Ethridge - Mrs. Harman
 James McCallon - Mr. Juster
 Helen Kleeb - Mrs. Juster

Production
The program aired on February 19, 1959, on the CBS television series Playhouse 90. Loring Mandel was the writer and Franklin Schaffner the director.

References

1959 American television episodes
Playhouse 90 (season 3) episodes
1959 television plays